Hudson Heights may refer to:
Hudson Heights, Manhattan, a  neighborhood in New York City
Hudson Heights, North Bergen, alternate name used for the Racetrack Section of North Bergen in Hudson County, New Jersey 
Hudson Heights, Quebec, a neighborhood in Hudson, Quebec